General transcription factor IIE subunit 2 (GTF2E2), also known as transcription initiation factor IIE subunit beta (TFIIE-beta), is a protein that in humans is encoded by the GTF2E2 gene.

See also 
 Transcription factor II E

References

Further reading 

 
 
 
 
 
 
 
 
 
 
 
 
 
 
 
 
 
 

Transcription factors